Malvina Marjorie Bolus,  (July 4, 1906 – April 6, 1997) was a Canadian historian and art collector, best known as the editor of the Hudson's Bay Company magazine The Beaver.

Born in Fox Bay, Falkland Islands, she was educated in England, and emigrated to Canada in 1926. From 1928 to 1936, she was a member of the House of Commons of Canada staff. From 1933 to 1936, she was the secretary to Agnes Macphail, the first woman to be elected to the House of Commons.

She started working at the Hudson's Bay Company in 1956 in public relations. From 1958 to 1972, she was the editor of The Beaver magazine.

She is the author of Image of Canada (1953), Eskimo Art (1967), and People and Pelts (1972).

In 1970, she was made an Officer of the Order of Canada.

References

Sources
 

1906 births
1997 deaths
Falkland Islands emigrants to Canada
Historians of Canada
Officers of the Order of Canada
People from Fox Bay
20th-century Canadian historians